Tang Jun (born 26 April 1968) is a Chinese former professional darts player, who played in Professional Darts Corporation events.

Career
Jun played on 2004 PDC China Telcom Cup, losing in the Last 16 to Wayne Mardle of England.

Jun played in the 2005 PDC World Darts Championship, but lost in the last 48 to Gerry Convery of Canada.

Jun Quit the PDC in 2005.

World Championship performances

PDC
 2005: Last 48: (lost to Gerry Convery 0–3) (sets)

References

External links

1968 births
Living people
Chinese darts players
Professional Darts Corporation associate players